The Port of Gaza is a small port near the Rimal district of Gaza City. It is the home port of Palestinian fishing-boats and the base of the Palestinian Naval Police, a branch of the Palestinian National Security Forces. Under the Oslo II Accord, the activities of the Palestinian Naval Police are restricted to 6 nautical miles from the coast. Since 2007, the Port of Gaza has been under an Israeli-imposed naval blockade as part of a blockade of the Gaza Strip, and activities at the port have been restricted to small-scale fishing.

History

Gaza Strip 
The Gaza strip has been put under a strict siege, by land, air, and sea. The total surface area of 362 square kilometers, owns a main poor transportation system that only has 76km of main roads, 122km of regional roads, and 99km of local roads. The strip had a small airport located at Rafah, which was destroyed in 2001 by Israel. The port was built by the Palestinian National Authority (PNA).

Maiuma 

In earlier times, the port of Maiuma, or el Mineh (meaning "the harbour"), was located in the area.
In the late Ottoman era, Pierre Jacotin named the place Majumas on his map from 1799.

In 1883, the PEF's Survey of Western Palestine (SWP) noted that el Mineh was probably the ancient Maiuma.

In 2011, eight Roman columns believed to be the remains of a church were swept ashore during a storm. In 2013, the Palestinian Naval Police found ancient artifacts that included poles and baked clay.

Since 1994
In 2002, Israeli forces attacked the Palestinian Naval Police facilities in the port, after Naval Police commanders were implicated in the Karine A affair, an attempt to secretly bring in 50 tons of weapons by boat into Gaza.

In 2007, following Hamas' takeover of Gaza, Israel imposed a blockade of the Gaza Strip, including a naval blockade. Several attempts to break the Israeli blockade have been made. Israel has prevented most ships from docking at the Port of Gaza, but did allow two boats, carrying activists and some supplies, to reach the port in 2008. As at 2010, the port was restricted to smaller Palestinian fishing boats.

In 2010, the port was deepened by Hamas in preparation for the arrival of a blockade-breaking flotilla of larger international ships. A breakwater was constructed and lighting was installed. Hamas announced plans to develop the port to make it more accessible to fishermen and attract tourists.

Gaza Seaport plans 

 

Since the 1993 Oslo I Accord, there have been plans to build a much larger seaport in Gaza. Due to the continuing Israeli–Palestinian conflict, these plans have not materialized as of 2014.

In 2005, Israel approved Palestinian plans to rebuild and complete the construction of a port a few miles south of Gaza City, which had begun before the outbreak of the Second Intifada in September 2000. The building was destroyed by Israeli forces together with Gaza's existing airport near Rafah following the outbreak of the Second Intifada.

References

Bibliography

External links 
 Photos of the Port and the Sea of Gaza on Facebook
 Survey of Western Palestine, Map 19: IAA, Wikimedia commons

Buildings and structures in the Gaza Strip
Ports and harbours of the Mediterranean
Nabataea
History of the Arabian Peninsula
History of Palestine (region)
Ports and harbours of the State of Palestine